= Luozi Pharmaceutical Research Center =

French research institute

The Luozi Pharmaceutical Research Center (CRPL) is a private medical research institution located in Luozi in the Democratic Republic of Congo, and one of the main research organizations in the country.

It was founded in 1980 by Doctor Étienne Flaubert Batangu Mpesa, who was chairman of the Board of Directors until his death in 2021.

Since 1987, the center has notably carried out systematic experiments to find treatments for malaria.

One of its objectives is the revaluation of the traditional African pharmacopoeia. Thus, one of the first works of the center was the confirmation of the effectiveness of a vermifuge derived from a plant called kizu, in Manianga and of an anti-diarrheal based on plants.

It produces in particular:

- Manadiar, launched on the market in 1981, antidiarrheal based on natural plants.
- Manalaria, created in 1984, natural anti-malarial well tolerated especially by pregnant women.
- Manacovid, used in the DRC for the treatment of certain symptoms of COVID-19
